Alexander Smith (October 14, 1818 – November 5, 1878) was a Yonkers, New York, businessman and political figure who founded the Alexander Smith & Sons Carpet Company and won election to the United States House of Representatives but died hours after being informed of his victory.

Biography
Alexander Smith was born in Mercer County, New Jersey, on October 14, 1818. He was raised on his family's farm, educated in New Jersey, and moved with his family to West Farms, New York, in 1834.

Smith became interested in manufacturing, and in 1844 established a shop in West Farms for making looms and carpets. The shop caught fire and was rebuilt, and after a second fire in 1864 Smith reestablished his business in Yonkers. His business prospered, especially after he invented a loom suitable for weaving fine carpets, which other carpet makers used under licensing agreements with Smith, and his two factories eventually employed more than 3,000 people.

A Republican, in 1878 he was the party's nominee for Congress in New York's 12th District. He became ill on election day, and died just a few hours after being informed that he had won.

Smith died in Yonkers on November 5, 1878.  He was buried at Oakland Cemetery in Yonkers.

His company continued to operate, and through successive mergers eventually moved to Mississippi as part of Mohawk Industries.

The Alexander Smith Carpet Mills Historic District in Yonkers was established in 1983, and contains many of the buildings that made up the factory and offices before the company moved out of New York.

See also
List of members-elect of the United States House of Representatives who never took their seats

References

External links

1818 births
1878 deaths
19th-century American inventors
19th-century American businesspeople
Businesspeople from New York (state)
Elected officials who died without taking their seats
New York (state) Republicans
People from Mercer County, New Jersey
People from Yonkers, New York